The girls' skeleton event at the 2020 Winter Youth  Olympics took place on 19 January at the St. Moritz-Celerina Olympic Bobrun.

Results
The first run was held at 14:00 and the second run at 15:15.

References

 

Girls'